St. Stephen Airport  is a registered aerodrome located  northeast of St. Stephen, New Brunswick, Canada.

The airport is classified as an airport of entry by Nav Canada. Canada Border Services Officers that handle this airport come from the nearby land border-crossing point joining St. Stephen and Calais, Maine. Customs services are available for general aviation aircraft only, with no more than 15 passengers.

References

External links
Town of St. Stephen - Airport

Registered aerodromes in New Brunswick
Buildings and structures in Charlotte County, New Brunswick
Transport in Charlotte County, New Brunswick
St. Stephen, New Brunswick